Horrible Histories: Gory Games is a children's game show, co-produced by Citrus Television and Lion Television for CBBC, that debuted in 2011. It is a spin-off of hit children's sketch comedy Horrible Histories and is a product of the same creative team.

History 
The show featured music by Matt Katz and Richie Webb, produced at Noisegate. The gameshow's participants are aged between 8 and 12.

The gameshow was adapted into an iOS/Android app, allowing players to play along with the contestants. It was available at  Google Play or the Apple App Store. The premiere app by the creative tea, SyncScreen was in charge of app design and user experience, and they used their proprietary SyncScreen Framework API technology. The app also used Civolution’s SyncNow Automatic Content Recognition, which increased the synchronicity of the experience. It was the "first mainstream "second screen" apps for kids", and was designed to be used by children while they were watching the show.

The app was launched in 2014 when Series 3 (2013) was re-edited under the new format. Series 1 (2011) went the same way in 2016. New episodes were made under the play-along format in Series 4 (2016), but by Series 5 (2018) the app had been removed from the App Store. After Series 5 (2018) completed broadcast, Series 4 (2016) shown again, but was re-edited to remove the play-along function.

Gameplay
Gory Games is co-hosted by comedian Dave Lamb and Rattus Rattus, the rat puppet who also "hosts" the parent series. The show revolves around "horrible facts". Gameplay involves three child contestants (called "Horrible Historians") trying to obtain "Year Spheres" by completing either a historically-themed physical challenge or a quiz. Each Year Sphere contains a year which is either A.D. or B.C. If it is A.D., the year is added to the player's score at the end of the show; if B.C., it is subtracted from it. The player with the highest overall score after three rounds is the winner.

These Year Sphere's are:

4,500,000,000 B.C. - Planet Earth was formed
2,500,000 B.C. - Neanderthal's first used tools
1,500,000 B.C. - Neanderthal's discovered fire
1,000,000 B.C. - Neanderthal's arrives in Britain
200,000 B.C. - Man appears 
150,000 B.C. - Man creates art
110,000 B.C. - Man learns to fish
23,000 B.C. - Neanderthals died out 
16,000 B.C. - Man invents pots & bowls
10,500 B.C. - End of last ice age
10,000 B.C. - Man domesticates dogs
9,000 B.C. - Man uses bow & arrow
8,500 B.C. - Man creates houses
8,000 B.C. - Woolly Mammoths became extinct
4,000 B.C. - Man starts farming/man domesticates horse
3600 B.C. - First known mummification
3500 B.C. - First pyramids constructed in Peru
3150 B.C. - Birth of the Awful Egyptians
3000 B.C. - Egyptian calendar created
2560 B.C. - Great Pyramid of Giza completed
2532 B.C. - Great Sphinx completed
2500 B.C. - Stonehenge built
2184 B.C. - Pepi II died
1479 B.C. - Hatshepsut becomes queen
1323 B.C. - Death of Tutankhamen
1213 B.C. - Death of Rameses II
776 B.C. - First Ancient Olympics
753 B.C. - The city of Rome is founded
508 B.C. - Democracy invented in Athens
495 B.C. - Death of Pythagoras
490 B.C. - Battle of Marathon
450 B.C. -  First set of Rotten Roman laws
449 B.C. - Battle of Salamis
432 B.C. - Parthenon built
405 B.C. - Peloponnesian War 
399 B.C. - Socrates is executed
347 B.C. - Plato died
337 B.C. - Death of Hippocrates
332 B.C. - Alexander the Great conquers Egypt
305 B.C. - Alexander the Great conquers Egypt 
287 B.C. - Archimedes was born
264 B.C. - First Roman Gladiator game
214 B.C. - Construction of the Great Wall of China begins
212 B.C. - Death of Archimedes
55 B.C. - Julius Caesar invades Britain
47 B.C. - Crafty Cleopatra returns to the throne
44 B.C. - Julius Caesar assassinated 
30 B.C. - Death of Crafty Cleopatra
27 B.C. - Caesar Augustus becomes the first Rotten Roman Emperor  
37 A.D. - Caligula becomes Emperor of the Rotten Romans
41 A.D. - Caligula assassinated 
60 A.D. - Bolshy Boudica rebels against the Rotten Romans
64 A.D. - The Rotten Romans burned to death
78 A.D. - Romans conquer Wales
79 A.D. - Pompeii destroyed/Rome Colosseum opened 
122 A.D. - Hadrian's Wall built
476 A.D. - Fall of the Rotten Roman Empire
793 A.D. - The Vicious Vikings attack the Lindisfarne monastery
800 A.D. - Gunpowder invented in China
867 A.D. - The Vicious Vikings army captured in York
871 A.D. - Awesome Alfred the Great becomes king of West Saxons
899 A.D. - Death of Awesome Alfred the Great
978 A.D. - Ethelred the Unready becomes king
991 A.D. - Battle of Maldon
1014 A.D. - Sweyn Forkbeard becomes king
1042 A.D. - Edward the Confessor became king
1066 A.D. - Battle of Hastings
1086 A.D. - Doomsday Book completed
1099 A.D. - First Crusade
1135 A.D. - Death of Henry I
1170 A.D. - Thomas Becket murdered
1189 A.D. - Richard the Lionheart becomes king
1199 A.D. - Death of Richard the Lionheart
1215 A.D. - Magna Carta signed
1286 A.D. - Eyeglasses invented
1305 A.D. - Execution of William Wallace
1337 A.D. - Beginning of Hundred Year War
1348 A.D. - Black Death
1381 A.D. - Peasant's Revolt 
1415 A.D. - Henry V of England beats the French at Agincourt
1431 A.D. - King Henry VI crowned King of France
1438 A.D. - Incan Empire begins
1452 A.D. - Leonardo da Vinci was born
1453 A.D. - End of Hundred Year War
1455 A.D. - War of Roses begins
1483 A.D. - Richard III becomes King of England
1485 A.D. - Richard III killed in battle
1492 A.D. - Christopher Columbus discovers the New World
1503 A.D. - Leonardo Da Vinci paints the Mona Lisa
1509 A.D. - Henry VIII ascends to the throne
1533 A.D. - King Henry VIII marries Anne Boleyn/Incan Empire fell
1536 A.D. - Anne Boleyn is executed
1542 A.D. - Mary, Queen of Scots becomes queen
1547 A.D. - Death of Henry VIII
1558 A.D. - Queen Elizabeth I ascends the throne
1564 A.D. - Birth of William Shakespeare
1587 A.D. - Execution of Mary, Queen of Scots
1588 A.D. - Spanish Armada destroyed
1599 A.D. - Globe Theater opened
1603 A.D. - Death of Queen Elizabeth I
1605 A.D. - Gunpowder Plot
1607 A.D. - Jamestown colony is founded
1613 A.D. - Globe Theater caught fire
1616 A.D. - William Shakespeare died 
1642 A.D. - Start of English Civil War
1658 A.D. - Death of Oliver Cromwell 
1665 A.D. - Great Plague of London 
1666 A.D. - Great Fire of London
1702 A.D. - Death of King William III
1707 A.D. - England and Scotland join together to create the UK
1727 A.D. - George II became king
1746 A.D. - Battle of Culloden
1756 A.D. - Wolfgang Amadeus Mozart is born
1760 A.D. - George III becomes king
1769 A.D. - Napoleon was born
1770 A.D. - Captain Cook claims Australia for Britain
1775 A.D. - American Revolution started
1776 A.D. - Declaration of Independence
1788 A.D. - First European settlement in Australia
1789 A.D. - French Revolution starts
1792 A.D. - Gas lighting is invented
1793 A.D. - Louis XVI & Marie Antoinette are executed
1801 A.D. - Union Jack is created
1804 A.D. - Napoleon crowns himself Emperor of France
1805 A.D. - Battle of Trafalgar
1815 A.D. - Battle of Waterloo
1819 A.D. - Queen Victoria is born
1821 A.D. - Napoleon Bonaparte died 
1837 A.D. - Queen Victoria becomes queen/Oliver Twist
1840 A.D. - Queen Victoria marries Prince Albert/Penny Black
1845 A.D. - Great Potato Famine 
1851 A.D. - The Great Exhibition
1852 A.D. - London's first flushing toilet opens to the public
1854 A.D. - Beginning of Crimean War
1858 A.D. - Big Ben completed
1859 A.D. - Pony Express invented
1861 A.D. - Death of Prince Albert
1865 A.D. - Lewis Carol publishes Alice in Wonderland/Abraham Lincoln assassinated 
1867 A.D. - Antiseptic invented/America buys Alaska
1869 A.D. - Mahatma Gandhi was born
1871 A.D. - Bank Holidays are invented
1875 A.D. - Law bans child chimney sweeps
1876 A.D. - Vacuum is invented 
1879 A.D. - Thomas Edison invents the lightbulb
1887 A.D. - First Sherlock Holmes book published 
1891 A.D. - School is made free
1893 A.D. - New Zealand is the first country to give woman the right to vote
1901 A.D. - Queen Victoria died
1903 A.D. - Wright Brothers invented the airplane
1914 A.D. - Beginning of WWI
1917 A.D. - Russian Revolution begins
1918 A.D. - End of WWI/Woman gain the right to vote
1929 A.D. - Wall Street Crash
1933 A.D. - Adolf Hitler becomes German chancellor 
1939 A.D. - Beginning of WWII
1944 A.D. - D-Day
1945 A.D. - End of WWII
1948 A.D. - NHS begins
1969 A.D. - Man lands on the moon
1991 A.D. - End of the Soviet Union
The games are divided into six categories: "Brainy", "Messy", "Scary", "Silly", "Gory" and "Death" (hosted by Death himself). Quiz questions manifest as either multiple-choice or true-or-false questions and may be asked either by Dave, Rattus, a live-action or animated character from that period, or—in Series 3—Death. "Prop questions" are also asked.

Similarly to its parent series, the games are grouped under randomly selected historical eras or civilizations based on Terry Deary's original books. To date the eras used in Gory Games are:

 Awful Egyptians
 Rotten Romans
 Measly Middle Ages
 Terrible Tudors
 Vile Victorians
 Vicious Vikings (Series 1–4)
 Groovy Greeks (Series 4 onwards)
 Savage Stone Age (Series 4 onwards)
 Slimy Stuarts (Series 3–4)
 Nasty Knights (Series 3)
 Putrid Pirates (Series 1–2)
 Gorgeous Georgians (Series 1–2)
 Frightful First World War (Series 2–3) (Note: This category was part of the Gory Grid in series 1, but it was never chosen in any of the rounds)
 Awesome USA (Series 5)
 Incredible Incas (Series 5)

As from series 3, at the end of the show, the two runners up ended up having to go home through the Time Sewer which was a slide leading to a tank of thick brown gunge.The kids were barefoot when they got gunged.

Cast members from the parent show make frequent cameo appearances as the historical questioners, as does Horrible Histories author Terry Deary.

Reception
Julia Raeside of The Guardian commented that the show has "no bleepy, flashy nonsense", and added that it "would have enthralled 20 years ago and is all the better for it."

The Guardian deemed the Gory Games TV Play-along app the 25th best app for kids for 2014, deeming it impressive that the technology that allows at-home children to play along with contestants in real-time also worked with repeats.

Awards and nominations
In 2013, the show was nominated for a Children's BAFTA award in the category of Entertainment.

Transmissions

References

External links
 
 
 

2011 British television series debuts
2018 British television series endings
2010s British game shows
BBC television game shows
British children's game shows
British television shows featuring puppetry
British television spin-offs
English-language television shows
Horrible Histories
Television series about children
Television series by All3Media